The 2007 WNBA season was the 11th season for the Houston Comets. The team started the season 0-10, finishing 13-11 in the remainder part of the season, and missing the playoffs for the first time in four years. It was also their last year playing at the Toyota Center.

Offseason

Dispersal Draft
With the folding of the Charlotte Sting, the league held a dispersal draft prior to the 2007 WNBA Draft. The order of teams picking players was based on their 2006 records. The Comets would be selecting 8th.

WNBA Draft

Trades and Roster Changes

Regular season

Season standings

Season schedule

Player stats

References

External links
 Comets on Basketball Reference

Houston Comets seasons
Houston
Houston